Rational Performance Tester is a tool for automated performance testing of web- and server-based applications from the Rational Software division of IBM. It allows users to create tests that mimic user transactions between an application client and server. During test execution, these transactions are replicated in parallel to simulate a large transaction load on the server. Server response time measurements are collected to identify the presence and cause of any potential application bottlenecks. It is primarily used by Software Quality Assurance teams to perform automated software performance testing.

References

External links
/Rational Performance Tester v10.0.2 Download
Rational Performance Tester Web Page
Rational Performance Product Documentation
Rational Performance Tester Technical Support
Using Rational Performance Tester v7 Redbook
Rational Performance Tester Download
Rational Tester Design Team Blog

Performance Tester
Load testing tools